Brave New Guitar is the first studio album by jazz guitarist Frank Gambale, released in 1985 through Legato Records.

Track listing

Personnel
Credits adapted from CD edition liner notes:
Frank Gambale – guitar, vocals, producer
Jon Crosse – saxophone, flute
Mark Gasbarro – keyboard
Kei Akagi – piano
Jack Kelly – drums
Steve Kershisnik – bass
Marcus Hinder – timbales, congas
Steve Reid – percussion
Wally Grant – engineering
Steve Hall – engineering
Mark Varney – executive producer

References

External links
Frank Gambale "Brave New Guitar" album review at Guitar Nine

Frank Gambale albums
1985 debut albums